Vavanga was a genus of flowering plants in the family Rubiaceae but is no longer recognized. It was originally described by Julius von Röhr in 1792 to accommodate the species V. chinensis. A second species, V. edulis, was added by Martin Vahl. The species have been sunk into synonymy with Vangueria.

References

External links
 World Checklist of Rubiaceae

Historically recognized Rubiaceae genera
Vanguerieae